Charlton Athletic Football Club was founded in 1905 and turned professional in 1920. They joined the English Football League in 1921. The club won their only FA Cup in 1947, having finished as runners-up 12 months earlier. The table details the club's achievements in all national and European first team competitions for each completed season.

Seasons

Overall
Seasons spent at Level 1 of the football league system: 26
Seasons spent at Level 2 of the football league system: 45
Seasons spent at Level 3 of the football league system: 21
Seasons spent at Level 4 of the football league system: 0

Key

P – Played
W – Games won
D – Games drawn
L – Games lost
F – Goals for
A – Goals against
Pts – Points
Pos – Final position

Prem – Premier League
Champ – EFL Championship
Lge 1 – EFL League One
Div 1 – Football League First Division
Div 2 – Football League Second Division
Div 3 – Football League Third Division
Div 3S – Football League Third Division South
SL – Southern League
KL – Kent League
n/a – Not applicable

6Q – Sixth qualifying round
PR – Preliminary round
GS – Group stage
R1 – First round
R2 – Second round
R3 – Third round
R4 – Fourth round
R5 – Fifth round
QF – Quarter-finals
SF – Semi-finals
RU – Runners-up
W – Winners
(S) – Southern section of regionalised stage

Note: Bold text indicates a competition won.
''Note 2: Where fields are left blank, the club did not participate in a competition that season.

Notes

References

Seasons
 
Charlton Athletic F.C.